Dothiorella brevicollis is an endophytic fungus that might be a latent plant pathogen. It was found on Acacia karroo, a common tree in southern Africa.

References

Further reading
Jami, Fahimeh, et al. "Greater Botryosphaeriaceae diversity in healthy than associated diseased Acacia karroo tree tissues." Australasian Plant Pathology 42.4 (2013): 421–430.
Pavlic-Zupanc, D., et al. "Molecular and morphological characterization of Dothiorella species associated with dieback of Ostrya carpinifolia in Slovenia and Italy, and a host and geographic range extension for D. parva."

External links
MycoBank

brevicollis
Fungi described in 2012
Fungal plant pathogens and diseases